Bradley is an unincorporated community in Scotts Bluff County, Nebraska, in the United States.

History
Bradley had its start by the building of the Chicago, Burlington and Quincy Railroad through that territory.

References

Unincorporated communities in Scotts Bluff County, Nebraska
Unincorporated communities in Nebraska